The mask of Tutankhamun is a gold funerary mask of the 18th-dynasty ancient Egyptian pharaoh Tutankhamun (reigned 1334–1325 BC). After being buried for over 3,000 years, it was excavated by Howard Carter in 1925 from tomb KV62 in the Valley of the Kings and is now in the Egyptian Museum in Cairo. The death mask is one of the best-known works of art in the world and a prominent symbol of ancient Egypt.

An ancient spell from the Book of the Dead is inscribed in hieroglyphs on the mask's shoulders. The mask had to be restored in 2015 after its  plaited beard fell off and was hastily glued back on by museum workers.

According to the Egyptologist Nicholas Reeves, the mask is "not only the quintessential image from Tutankhamun's tomb, it is perhaps the best-known object from ancient Egypt itself." Since 2001, some Egyptologists have suggested that it may originally have been intended for Queen Neferneferuaten.

Discovery 

Tutankhamun's burial chamber was found at the Theban Necropolis in the Valley of the Kings in 1922 and opened in 1923. It would be another two years before the excavation team, led by the English archaeologist Howard Carter, was able to open the heavy sarcophagus containing Tutankhamun's mummy. On 28 October 1925, they opened the innermost of three coffins to reveal the gold mask, seen for the first time in approximately 3,250 years. Carter wrote in his diary:

The pins removed, the lid was raised. The penultimate scene was disclosed – a very neatly wrapped mummy of the young king, with golden mask of sad but tranquil expression, symbolizing Osiris … the mask bears that god's attributes, but the likeness is that of Tut.Ankh.Amen – placid and beautiful, with the same features as we find upon his statues and coffins. The mask has fallen slightly back, thus its gaze is straight up to the heavens.

In December 1925, the mask was removed from the tomb, placed up in a crate and transported  to the Egyptian Museum in Cairo, where it remains on public display.

Description 
X-ray crystallography conducted in 2007 revealed that the mask is primarily made of copper-alloyed 23 karat gold to facilitate the cold working used to shape the mask. The surface of the mask is covered in a very thin layer (approximately 30 nanometres) of two different alloys of gold: a lighter 18.4 karat shade for the face and neck, and 22.5 karat gold for the rest of the mask.

The face represents the pharaoh's standard image, and the same image was found by excavators elsewhere in the tomb, in particular in the guardian statues. He wears a nemes headcloth, topped by the royal insignia of a cobra (Wadjet) and vulture (Nekhbet), symbolising Tutankhamun's rule of both Lower Egypt and Upper Egypt respectively. The ears are pierced to hold earrings, a feature that appears to have been reserved for queens and children in almost all surviving ancient Egyptian works of art. The Egyptologist Zahi Hawass, a former Egyptian Minister of Antiquities, told Al-Monitor that the "theory about the ear piercing is unfounded because all the 18th Dynasty's rulers wore earrings during their period of rule."

The mask is inlaid with coloured glass and gemstones, including lapis lazuli (the eye surrounds and eyebrows), quartz (the eyes), obsidian (the pupils), carnelian, amazonite, turquoise, and faience.

Beard 
When it was discovered in 1925, the  narrow gold beard, inlaid with blue glass, giving it a plaited effect, had become separated from the mask, but it was reattached to the chin using a wooden dowel in 1944.

In August 2014, the beard fell off when the mask was taken out of its display case for cleaning. The museum workers responsible used quick-drying epoxy in an attempt to fix it, leaving the beard off-center. The damage was noticed in January 2015 and has been repaired by a German-Egyptian team who reattached it using beeswax, a natural material used by the ancient Egyptians.

In January 2016, it was announced that eight employees of the Egyptian Museum were fined and faced discipline for allegedly ignoring scientific and professional methods of restoration and causing permanent damage to the mask. A former director of the museum and a former director of restoration were among those facing discipline.

Inscription 

A protective spell is inscribed with Egyptian hieroglyphs on the back and shoulders in ten vertical and two horizontal lines. The spell first appeared on masks in the Middle Kingdom, 500 years before Tutankhamun, and was used in Chapter 151 of the Book of the Dead.

Thy right eye is the night bark (of the sun-god), thy left eye is the day-bark, thy eyebrows are (those of) the Ennead of the Gods, thy forehead is (that of) Anubis, the nape of thy neck is (that of) Horus, thy locks of hair are (those of) Ptah-Sokar. (Thou art) in front of the Osiris (Tutankhamun). He sees thanks to thee, thou guidest him to the goodly ways, thou smitest for him the confederates of Seth so that he may overthrow thine enemies before the Ennead of the Gods in the great Castle of the Prince, which is in Heliopolis … the Osiris, the King of Upper Egypt Nebkheperure [Tutankhamun's throne-name], deceased, given life by Re.

Osiris was the Egyptian god of the afterlife. Ancient Egyptians believed that kings preserved in the likeness of Osiris would rule the Kingdom of the Dead. It never totally replaced the older cult of the sun, in which dead kings were thought to be reanimated as the sun-god Re, whose body was made of gold and lapis lazuli. This confluence of old and new beliefs resulted in a mixture of emblems inside Tutankhamun's sarcophagus and tomb.

Bead necklace 
Although it is usually removed when the mask is on display, it has a triple-string necklace of gold and blue faience disc-beads with lotus flower terminals and uraeus clasps.

Possible alteration and reuse 
Several of the objects in Tutankhamun's tomb are thought to have been adapted for Tutankhamun's use after originally being made for either of two pharaohs whose short reigns preceded his: Neferneferuaten, who was probably Nefertiti, and Smenkhkare. Egyptologist Nicholas Reeves argues that the mask was one of these objects. He says that the pierced ears indicate that the mask was intended for a female pharaoh, which Neferneferuaten was; that the slightly different composition of the underlying alloy of the face (23.2 karats) suggests it was made independently from the rest of the mask (23.5 karat alloy); and that the cartouches on the mask show signs of being altered from Neferneferuaten's name to Tutankhamun's. Reeves argues that the nemes-headcloth, collar, and ears of the mask were made for Neferneferuaten but that the face, which was made as a separate piece of metal and matches other portrayals of Tutankhamun, was added later, replacing an original face that presumably represented Neferneferuaten. However, Christian Eckmann, the metal conservation expert who carried out the restoration in 2015, says there are no signs that the face is composed of a different gold than the rest of the mask or that the cartouches have been altered.

Gallery

See also 
 Exhibitions of artifacts from the tomb of Tutankhamun

References

Sources

External links 

 Howard Carter's diaries at the Griffith Institute

Tutankhamun
Art of ancient Egypt
Egyptian Museum
Archaeological artifacts
Sculptures of ancient Egypt
14th-century BC works
1925 archaeological discoveries
Death customs
Tutankhamun
Masks in Africa